Jacobi Mitchell (born January 4, 1986) is a Bahamian sprinter from Freeport, Bahamas who competed in the 100m and 200m and 400m. He attended Freeport Anglican High School later changed to Bishop Michael Eldon School before going on to compete for the University of Oklahoma. 

He ran the 200m at the 2007 World Championships in Athletics in Osaka, Japan. He also competed in the 200m and the 4x 100m Relay at the 2007 Pan American Games in Rio de Janeiro, Brazil.  Mitchell competed at the 2004 World Junior Championships in Athletics in Grosseto, Italy.

Personal bests

References

External links
 World Athletics

1986 births
Living people
Bahamian male sprinters
People from Freeport, Bahamas
Oklahoma Sooners men's track and field athletes
Athletes (track and field) at the 2007 Pan American Games
Pan American Games competitors for the Bahamas
Junior college men's track and field athletes in the United States
South Plains College alumni